Kelley Hurley (born April 4, 1988) is an American épée fencer. She won the bronze medal in the women's team épée event at the 2012 Summer Olympics. A standout at the University of Notre Dame, she was a 4-time All-American. She has qualified to represent the United States in fencing at the 2020 Olympics in Tokyo in 2021.

Coached by their father, Bob Hurley, Kelley and her younger sister Courtney have competed on World Teams together since Kelley was 17. Kelley qualified for her first Olympic Team in 2008 as the only women's épée fencer from the United States to do so. In 2012, Hurley qualified for her second team as a replacement athlete. Hurley won bronze in the team event as a member of the first U.S. Women's Épée Team ever to earn an Olympic medal. Hurley went into the Rio 2016 Olympics ranked 18th in the world in the individual épée.

See also
List of USFA Division I National Champions

References

1988 births
Living people
Fencers at the 2008 Summer Olympics
Fencers at the 2012 Summer Olympics
Fencers at the 2016 Summer Olympics
Olympic bronze medalists for the United States in fencing
Medalists at the 2012 Summer Olympics
American female épée fencers
Pan American Games medalists in fencing
Pan American Games gold medalists for the United States
Universiade medalists in fencing
Fencers at the 2003 Pan American Games
Universiade silver medalists for the United States
Medalists at the 2011 Summer Universiade
Medalists at the 2003 Pan American Games
Fencers at the 2020 Summer Olympics
21st-century American women
Left-handed fencers